"Mr Blobby" is a novelty song performed by character Mr Blobby, famous for appearing in the TV programme Noel's House Party. The song originally peaked at No. 1 on the UK Singles Chart on 11 December 1993 for one week but reclaimed the top spot to become the Christmas number one single, and spent a total of three weeks at No. 1.

It was written by Philip Raxster, produced by Paul Shaw and David Rogers, and was released on 22 November 1993.

Despite its chart success, it has been critically panned by critics, often naming it as one of the worst songs ever recorded.

Chart performance
The single reached No. 1 on the UK Singles Chart on 11 December 1993, replacing Meat Loaf's "I'd Do Anything for Love (But I Won't Do That)", which had been in the No. 1 spot for seven weeks. A week later, "Babe" by Take That demoted Mr Blobby from the top spot for one week. Mr Blobby made a surprise return to the No. 1 spot on Christmas Day, and repeated that position the following week.

Critical reception
An MTV critic said that Blobby "tried to kill music... with what might be the worst song of all time"; the track is often named as such. Rupert Hawksley of The Telegraph ranked it as the worst Christmas number one in history, arguing that Blobby "set the bar so low with this bizarre single, it's hard to imagine that it could ever be usurped". Daily Record writer Euan McColm named it the third-worst Top 10 single of all time. It placed first in an HMV public poll of the worst-ever festive songs, and second in a VH1 viewer survey of the worst number one singles of all time. The track also came sixth in a Channel 4 poll of the 100 worst pop songs in history.

Music video
A music video was created for the single and was filmed in the Kew Bridge Steam Museum. It spoofed several music videos such as "Addicted to Love" by Robert Palmer, "Stay" by Shakespears Sister, Snap!'s "Rhythm Is a Dancer", and "I Can't Dance" by Genesis.

The video featured Noel Edmonds, Carol Vorderman, Wayne Sleep, Garth Crooks and Top Gear presenter Jeremy Clarkson as Mr Blobby's limo driver.

Track listing
"Mr Blobby"
"Mr Blobby's Theme"
"Mr Blobby" (Instrumental Mix)
"Mr Blobby "Blobby, Blobby, Blobby""

Charts and certifications

Weekly charts

Certifications

References

1993 songs
1993 debut singles
UK Singles Chart number-one singles
Novelty songs
Songs about television
Songs about fictional male characters
Christmas number-one singles in the United Kingdom
Bertelsmann Music Group singles